Elazığ İl Özel İdaresi Spor Kulübü  is a Turkish women's basketball club based in Elazığ, Turkey. The club was founded in 2010 and currently competing in the Turkish Super League and EuroCup Women.

History
Elazığ İl Özel İdarespor was founded in 2010 and started to compete in professional leagues in 2014. After four seasons in the Second League, the club started the 2018–19 season with the Federation Cup championship and finished the season with the play-off championship in the Second League and promoted to the Super League. In their first season, they finished the first half of the Super League in the 4th place and qualified to compete in the Turkish Cup. After the 2020 Elazığ earthquake, the club had to move to Ankara and played their home games in there until the league was canceled due to the COVID-19 pandemic. They finished the canceled league in 8th place and qualified for the EuroCup. In the 2020–21 season, the club competed in European competitions for the first time in their history. They reached the quarterfinals but lost to KSC Szekszárd.

Current squad

Honours

European competitions
 EuroCup Women
 Quarter finals: 2020–2021

Domestic competitions
 Second League
 Play-off champion: 2018–2019
 Federation Cup
 Champion: 2018–2019

League performances

Notable players

Ariel Atkins (1 season: 2020)
Chennedy Carter (1 season: 2020)
Emma Cannon (1 season: 2020-2021)
Jackie Young (1 season: 2020)
Kelsey Mitchell (1 season: 2020-2021)
Kia Vaughn (1 season: 2019-2020)
Lauren Ervin (2 season: 2018-2020)
Riquna Williams (1 season: 2019-2020)

Iva Slonjšak (1 season: 2019-2020)

Alena Hanušová (1 season: 2020)

Jelena Dubljević (1 season: 2020-2021)

Nika Barič (1 season: 2020-2021)

References

External links
 Turkish Basketball Federation 
 Eurobasket team page

Women's basketball teams in Turkey
Sport in Elazığ
Basketball teams established in 2010
2010 establishments in Turkey